The Amazing Race is an adventure reality game show franchise in which teams of two people race around the world in competition with other teams. The Race is split into legs, with teams tasked to deduce clues, navigate themselves in foreign areas, interact with locals, and perform physical and mental challenges that often highlight aspects of a location's culture, history, or economy. Over the course of the Race, teams travel by airplanes, helicopters, trucks, bicycles, taxicabs, cars, trains, buses, boats and by foot. Teams are progressively eliminated at the end of most legs for being the last to arrive at designated Pit Stops, until only three remain. The first team to arrive at the finish line is awarded the grand prize.

Created by Elise Doganieri and Bertram van Munster, the original series has aired in the United States since 2001 and has earned thirteen Primetime Emmy Awards, ten of them for "Outstanding Reality-Competition Program". Emmy-award-winning New Zealand television personality Phil Keoghan has been the host of the American version of the show since its inception. The show has branched out to include a number of international versions following a similar format.

The Race 
Each race depicted in The Amazing Race is broken up into a number of legs – 10 to 13 in the original American version. In each leg, teams leave the Pit Stop of the previous leg and travel to a different location, where they perform two or more tasks – often including one Detour and one Roadblock – before being given instructions to go to the next Pit Stop. It is every team's goal to complete each leg as quickly as possible, as the first team to check in at the Pit Stop will often win a prize; the prizes have included all-expenses-paid trips, new cars or other vehicles, money, entertainment provided during the Pit Stop, and advantages to be used later in the race (see Express Pass, Salvage Pass, and Double Your Money). The last team to arrive at the Pit Stop will often be eliminated from the competition, but occasionally the team is allowed to continue racing, though they will be given a race-imposed disadvantage in the next leg (see Non-elimination legs). When teams are otherwise not performing tasks or traveling during a leg, they are free to use their time as they see fit, although they will often resort to eating cheaply or sleeping outside a location to save their Race money.

Teams 

Typically, each cycle of the Race features eleven teams, each composed of two people with a pre-existing relationship. Examples include dating, engaged, married, and divorced couples; siblings; parents and their children; lifelong friends; sports team colleagues; and co-workers. Original Race rules required that teammates have had a pre-existing relationship of more than three years, and no previous acquaintances with other racers during that cycle. Individual racers must be of a specific nationality and meet specific age requirements; this is necessary to allow teams to obtain the necessary passport documentation to travel across the world without incident.

The team format has varied in some seasons. Five seasons featured 12 teams of two rather than the standard 11, while the "Family Edition" featured ten teams of four racers, some of whom were young children. Seasons 26 and 29 included teams made up of people who met for the first time just prior to the start of the race. Some formats featured as few as eight (as seen in the Chinese celebrity edition) or as many as 14 (fourth and fifth seasons of the Israeli version), 16 (fifth Australian season), or 20 (sixth Australian season) teams.

Normally unseen, a two-person audio and video production crew accompanies every team, recording them as they race. Generally, teams may not travel without their production crew, who are switched among teams after each leg to avoid biases from developing.

Money 
At the beginning of each leg, each team receives a cash allowance with their first clue, from which they must cover all expenses (food, transportation, lodging, attraction admission, and supplies) except for airfare, which is covered by a production-provided credit card (in the eighth season, this card could also be used to purchase gasoline). Allowance money is usually given in the same currency as the show's nation regardless of location; American seasons of The Amazing Race usually provide racers with U.S. dollars, (although in one exception, teams were given Vietnamese đồng at the start of a leg in Vietnam). The amount of money varies from leg to leg, and has ranged from hundreds of dollars to nothing. The teams are allowed to keep any unused money for future legs, barring certain penalties for finishing last.

If team members spend all of their money or have it taken away in a non-elimination leg, they may then attempt to obtain more money in any way that does not violate local laws; this includes borrowing money from other teams, begging from locals (except for some countries, where begging is illegal), or selling their possessions. Since Season Seven, teams have been prevented from begging at United States airports, and teams may not use their personal possessions to barter payment for services.

Teams have reported on the existence of an emergency fund of approximately $200 that is carried by their crew and can only be used in extreme circumstances, but generally not as a means to pay for any activity related to the race. However, neither the exact amount nor the specific circumstances when it can be used have been confirmed.

Route markers 

Route markers are uniquely-colored flags that mark the places where teams must go. Most route markers are attached to the boxes that contain clue envelopes, but some may mark the places where the teams must go in order to complete tasks, or may be used to line courses that the teams must follow.

The route markers used in the inaugural American season were colored yellow and white (it was later used as one of the three color schemes in the Norwegian version). They were changed to yellow and red in the second American season, and this has remained the standard color scheme since. Occasionally, different color schemes are adopted for certain legs, seasons, or versions of the race.

Clues 
When teams start a leg, arrive at route markers, or complete tasks, they normally receive a letter-sized tear-away envelope that contains their next clue inside a vertical-fold folder. The envelopes are usually yellow, but in the first two seasons of the Latin American version, the envelopes are blue. The clues themselves are typically printed on a vertical strip of paper, although additional information is often provided inside the clue folder. After retrieving the clue, teams open the envelope and must read aloud the instructions given on the clue sheet, then follow those instructions. Teams are generally required to collect every clue during each leg and keep that information with them until they reach the next Pit Stop, surrendering them once they have checked in. Teams may not take an additional clue from the clue box should they lose their first one; teams who do so are assessed a penalty. Teams are not directly penalized for misplacing their clue but will lose time either searching for it or trying to learn from other teams of where to go next.

At route markers, clue envelopes are placed inside a box mounted to the marker. In early seasons, the box contained exactly the number of clues for teams on that leg, allowing teams to indirectly determine their current placement in the leg by counting envelopes. In more recent seasons, extra envelopes are left in clue boxes to prevent this from occurring.

In some cases, clues – most often of the Route Information type – have been provided by more unorthodox means, such as in an advertisement in a local newspaper or on some item related to the task just performed. A common unorthodox means in the American version is to place the clue at the bottom of the Roaming Gnome, the mascot of Travelocity, the former sponsor of the American version.

Route Information 

Route Information clues usually instruct the teams where to go next. Such a clue often provides only the name of the team's next destination; it is up to the teams to figure out how to get there. The destination may be given in a cryptic manner, such as a flag representing the country whose capital they are to fly to, or an obfuscation such as the "westernmost point in mainland Europe". In these cases, teams may use any resources, such as the help of locals or borrowing an Internet-connected device, to deduce the required destination.

Route Information clues will sometimes specify one or more modes of transportation that teams must take. This may include prearranged travel or for charter flights, buses, or boats to more remote locations. Teams may also be provided with a rented vehicle and will be required to navigate themselves with it until further notice. Route Information clues may also restrict teams to specific modes of transport, such as requiring them to walk to their next destination. Teams who fail to follow travel instructions will usually be required to go back and follow them correctly if possible, or else they will receive a penalty at the next Pit Stop (see Penalties and time credits). If no mode of transport is specified, teams are free to use any option available excluding private vehicles.

Detour 

A Detour presents the team with a choice between two tasks, one of which must be completed before the team is allowed to continue. The two tasks are named, often based on rhymes, puns or wordplay - such as "Plow" / "Fowl" to differentiate between a task involving plowing against a task involving corralling ducks. Teams are given several details about both tasks but may need to travel a short distance by foot or car to the different task locations. The two tasks generally involve different skills, often pairing physically demanding or fear-challenging tasks alongside tasks that rely on intelligence or craftsmanship. The decision about which task to attempt lies solely with the team, though due to logistical constraints some Detour options may impose additional limits, such as how many teams may attempt one of the tasks at one time, or the hours when a task may be available. A team may switch tasks as often as they wish with no penalty other than the time lost in attempting the tasks and travelling between task locations. In some Detours, teams that arrived at one of the tasks could not switch. Unless otherwise instructed, teams can work together to finish a Detour option. Once a team has completed one of the tasks, they are given a clue to their next location. A team that is unable to complete either Detour option or opts to quit the Detour will incur a six-hour penalty (24 hours in earlier seasons).

Occasionally, there may be a twist to the Detour format. Season 25 introduced a "Blind Detour", where competitors were only given the names and locations of the tasks (in some Blind Detours, the tasks will only be named "This" or "That", further reducing the information available). Season 26 featured a "Roulette Detour", where the Detour choice was determined by a spin of a roulette wheel, with Red leading to one task and Black leading to the other. The seventh Canadian season introduced a "One Way" twist that forces a team to perform a specified Detour task.

Roadblock 

A Roadblock is a task that only one team member may perform. A Roadblock clue is given as a cryptic question, such as "Who's really hungry?" (leading to a task involving exotic food) or "Who wants to get down and dirty?" (for a task related to laundry). Based on this information and observation of any other racers at the task, the team must declare which member will complete the task before reading the full task description. Once a team announces its decision of who will complete the Roadblock, it cannot be changed or taken back. The Roadblock task is performed by only the selected racer while his or her partner waits in a designated area, although the partner is sometimes able to supply words of encouragement and advice. Unless directed by the task instructions, the selected racer may gain help from other racers that have been selected to do the Roadblock or from locals. Some Roadblocks may involve the non-selected racer, such as leading a camel his or her partner rides, or helping his or her partner solve a puzzle. On completing the Roadblock, the selected racer receives their next clue, at which point they may return to their partner and continue on. If a racer is unable to complete a Roadblock, or opts to quit a Roadblock, the team must take a four-hour penalty, which either starts when the next team arrives at the Roadblock, or if all teams are present, when they reach the Pit Stop for that leg. In Seasons 7, 15 and 31 and some foreign versions of the show however, the four-hour penalty was served at the Roadblock location and ended before they could continue racing. Some legs feature two Roadblocks, each of which must be completed by different teammates.

Through the first five seasons, there was no limit on the number of Roadblocks that a single team member could perform throughout the race. In practice, this often led to one team member performing the majority of Roadblocks during the race (the male member of co-ed teams performed most of the Roadblocks in such cases). The rule has changed in Season 6, teams have been limited in the number of Roadblocks each teammate may do over the course of a race, effectively making both racers complete about an equal number of Roadblocks, where it has become a traditional norm in subsequent seasons, as well as all international versions.

Fast Forward 

A Fast Forward is an optional task that, once completed, allows the team that completes it to bypass all remaining tasks in the leg and proceed directly to the Pit Stop. The Fast Forward clue is given with another task clue and is a separate task from the others. Only one team may complete a Fast Forward in any given leg, and a team generally may claim only one Fast Forward in the entire race, though Fast Forwards claimed with the Intersection do not count towards this limit. Teams that win a Fast Forward pass are not guaranteed a first-place finish for that leg and still face elimination if they arrive at the Pit Stop last. Multiple teams may attempt Fast Forward tasks, but only the first team to complete the task may claim the pass; all other teams must return to the main course and complete the leg as normal.

Fast Forwards were initially offered on every leg of the Race, excluding the final leg. To reduce costs of production involved with unused Fast Forward tasks, the number of Fast Forwards available was reduced to two on each Race starting in Season Five, and then down to one in Season 14, or in Season 20, where three Fast Forwards were offered.

Season 18 and Season 19 were the seasons to not feature the Fast Forward for the first time, it was absent again in Season 24, it was absent yet again in Season 26, it was absent once again in Season 28, and it has not been featured since Season 30. However, it is still available in some foreign versions.

Obstacles 
Besides clues, teams may encounter the following obstacles, which could affect their placements in a leg:

Starting Line Task 
First introduced in Season 15, the Starting Line Task forces teams to complete a nearby challenge before receiving the clue to their first international destination. Often, the challenge merely determines which teams will receive the right to take the quickest flight; on several occasions, the last team to finish received a penalty to be served later in the race, or in some cases, was immediately eliminated from the race altogether (see Unusual eliminations).

In The Amazing Race Australia v New Zealand, the two nations' teams were pitted against each other in a game of tug of war, with the winning nation's teams given a ten-minute head start.

In the fourth and fifth seasons of the Israeli version, the 14 teams were divided into two groups of seven on the first leg; each group began the Race at separate Starting lines, and had separate tasks to complete before reaching the Pit Stop, where the last-place teams in each group were eliminated. The remaining teams were merged at the start of the second leg, at which point the race returned to its standard format. This twist was used again in the sixth Australian season, but unlike the two aforementioned Israeli seasons, it has been separated into two legs with the 20 teams divided into two groups of ten for each leg.

Yield 

The Yield, introduced in Season Five, allows any one team to force another team to stop racing for a predetermined amount of time. The Yield marker is placed just before a route marker, and teams are required to stop at it and declare their intentions to employ or decline the Yield. A team choosing to use a Yield must stick a photo of the yielded team on the Yield marker, as well as a smaller photo of themselves onto an attached section labeled "Courtesy of". When a team who has been yielded arrives at the marker, they must turn over an hourglass and wait for the sand to drain before they are allowed to continue on to the next route marker. Similar to the Fast Forward, a team may use its Yield power only once on the race, and only one team may be yielded at each marker, although a team may be yielded multiple times during the same race. If a team loses its "Courtesy of" photo, they also lose their Yield power. If a team yields a team that has already passed the marker, the Yield is nullified.

When the Yield was introduced, teams would not be warned of any upcoming Yields. Beginning in Season Six, teams were given warning ("Caution, Yield Ahead!") in the preceding clue that a Yield marker was just ahead. Teams were given opportunities to yield on all but the final leg of Season Five; opportunities were reduced in subsequent seasons until the Yield was replaced by a similar obstacle: the U-Turn. While the Yield was not a presence in the American Race for twenty seasons, they are still used within foreign versions, later made a return to the American version in Season 32 and has not been featured since Season 33.

Some variants and twists on the Yield include:
The second season of the Israeli version and the second season of the Philippine version both allowed teams to vote among themselves for which team would be Yielded later in the leg.
The inaugural season of the Philippine version introduced the "Anonymous Yield," in which yielding teams were not required to attach a "Courtesy of" photo, allowing them to keep their identities as secret.
In Season 32, teams were tasked to find either a 10-minute or a 20-minute hourglass at an early challenge; teams using their Yield later in the race would force the yielded team to wait for the amount of time marked on the hourglass the yielding team found.

Pass
Introduced in the eighth season of the Canadian version, the Pass is essentially a variation on the Yield, where a team can elect to force another team to stop racing for an undetermined amount of time, and wait to be passed by a third team before they can continue racing. Unlike the Yield, the waiting time for the Pass is indeterminate and the Pass is nullified if used on the team currently in last place.

U-Turn 

The U-Turn, introduced in the 12th American season, allows a team to force another team to complete both Detour tasks in the leg. Similar to the Yield, a U-Turn marker board is placed on the route either immediately before or immediately after the Detour on certain legs and teams must pause at the marker to declare their intentions to employ or decline the U-Turn before continuing. The team choosing to U-Turn must stick a photo of the U-Turned team on the U-Turn marker, as well as a smaller photo of themselves onto an attached section labelled "Courtesy of". A team generally may exercise their U-Turn power once throughout the race, though in the 29th American season and the Canadian version, there is no limit on how many times a team could use a U-Turn. If a U-Turned team is in possession of an Express Pass, they may use it to skip one – but not both – of the Detour tasks. If a team U-Turns a team which has already passed the marker, the U-Turn is nullified. As seen in the third Israeli season, one leg had two Detours and a U-Turn and the team who were subjected to the U-Turn was required to complete both Detours applicable for the first U-Turn only. The 32nd American season to date was the last season in the American series to feature a U-Turn. However, it has still been featured in the Australian version.

Some variants and twists on the U-Turn include:
The "Blind U-Turn" (or "Anonymous U-Turn") introduced in Season 14, forgoes the "Courtesy of" sticker, allowing teams to U-Turn one another anonymously.
The "Double U-Turn", introduced in Season 17, allows two teams to U-Turn at the same marker. The two teams must U-Turn different teams, though it is possible for a team to U-Turn another and be U-Turned themselves.
The "Blind Double U-Turn" (or "Anonymous Double U-Turn"), introduced in Season 21, combines the Blind (or Anonymous) and Double U-Turns; both of the teams who choose to U-Turn may do so anonymously.
A different variant of the Double U-Turn, as seen in the third Israeli season, was only offered for a team who receives the U-Turn. The first U-Turn was decided by a vote.
The "Automatic U-Turn", introduced in Season 18, forced the team who came in last in the starting line task to do both tasks of the first Detour. Similarly, the Automatic U-Turn has been used to handicap teams finishing last in that season as well as in the fourth Latin American season.
Occasionally, teams have been tasked with voting among themselves for who should be U-Turned, with the team(s) receiving the most votes being forced to do both Detour tasks. This was introduced in the second season of the Israeli version, and has since been employed in other versions, with some variations or additional twists.

One Way
Introduced in the seventh season of the Canadian version, the One Way is a variation of the U-Turn that can elect a team to force another team to do a specific task.

Intersection 

The Intersection, introduced in Season 10, requires each team to pair up with one other team; the two teams are to perform all tasks and make decisions together until further notice. Both teams must choose the same Detour option, and if a Fast Forward is offered, both teams may claim credit. During Roadblocks, each team must contribute a team member to do the task.

When a team arrives at the Intersection marker and no other team is already waiting, it must wait there until another team arrives. A team may opt not to partner with a particular team, though it must then wait for another team to arrive. Teams are free to choose their partner team if multiple teams are present. In the second and third seasons of the Chinese celebrity edition, teams voted for the team they wished to pair with.

Seasons 12, 13, 14 and 15 were the seasons to not include an Intersection for the first time, and it has not been featured since Season 17. However, it is still available in some foreign versions.

Head-to-Head 

The Head-to-Head forces teams to compete against each other one-on-one in a specific task. The winning team is given the next clue (or is allowed to check in at the nearby Pit Stop), while the losing team(s) must wait for the next team's arrival to start the task over. In one variation, the head-to-head appears in the middle of a leg, and the team that loses the last round will often receive a penalty – most often a predetermined time penalty – before receiving the next clue. In another variation, introduced in Season 30, the head-to-head was placed immediately before the Pit Stop, with winning teams allowed to check in; the last two remaining teams will then battle it out, with the losing team declared to be in last place, and the head-to-head has not been featured since Season 32. This was first introduced in the second Latin American season and the second Norwegian season as the "Intersection" (not to be confused with the collaborative obstacle outlined above), and it has appeared in other versions under different names, including "Double Battle" (Israeli version), "Versus" (first and second seasons of the Chinese celebrity edition), "Face Off" (third and fourth seasons of the Chinese celebrity edition and the Canadian version) and "Duel" (Philippine version).

T-Junction 
Occasionally, teams will be forced to team up to compete against other paired up teams – this can either be for a single challenge or an entire leg. The "T-Junction" name comes from the twist that was intended to be introduced on the fifth Australian season, but earlier seasons featured similar twists.

The first instance of this was The Amazing Race Australia v New Zealand, where teams occasionally competed in "Nation vs Nation" challenges – teaming up with teams from their country in a challenge against teams from the other country.

Another variation of the twist was used on the second and third seasons of the Chinese celebrity edition. This twist titled "Intersection with Integration Versus" in the second season and "Combined Intersection and Face Off" in the third season forced the four remaining teams to pair up as in the Intersection. Within each pair, the two teams would face off in a best-of-five series of challenges over the course of the leg; the two teams who finished best in each pair are declared tied for first place in the leg; the two losing teams face off in a final challenge, with the losing team declared the last-place team.

The fifth Australian season, which intended to feature the T-Junction had teams to join up to form two super-teams and perform all tasks in one leg as a group. The first team to reach the T-Junction would determine who would be in which super-team. The second super-team to check into the Pit Stop would then have to decide which pair from their super-team to eliminate from the race.

Hazard 
	
The Hazard, only seen in Season 19 to date, is a penalty task that must be performed by the team who came in last at the starting line task, similar to the Speed Bump.

Switchback 
A Switchback is a challenge in which teams encounter a task from a previous season that was markedly difficult or memorable. The Switchback is associated with the same country or city as the original task, and often done at the same specific location. For example, the first Switchback in Season 15 recreated a hay-rolling Roadblock from Season Six's visit to Sweden; and a Switchback in Season 27 forced teams to free fall  into the Batoka Gorge and swing above the Zambezi River, as was done in the first leg of the inaugural season. Other than making note of the noteworthiness of the challenge, the Switchback did not affect the game mechanics of the race.

Invasion 
Some versions of the show may introduce new racers part-way into the race. The first instance of such a twist was the "Invasion" twist on the second season of the Chinese celebrity edition, where intruder teams had the opportunity to enter the competition mid-season should they finish a leg with a sufficiently high placement as pre-determined. If the invasion was successful, they would be allowed to continue in the race and the last placing original team of the original teams would be eliminated. If the invasion was not successful, the new team would be eliminated regardless of the placement and the remaining teams would all continue onto the next leg. This twist was not used in later seasons of the Chinese celebrity edition, except for a team arriving on the second leg of the fourth season of the Chinese celebrity edition due to prior commitments. The first leg was a non-elimination round to account for this late arrival. Additionally, this late arrival team did not have to achieve a particular placement.

The fifth Australian season also featured new racers mid-race, calling them "Stowaway Teams". The "Stowaway Team" did not have to achieve a particular placement in their debut leg, they simply arrived and were treated like normal racers (with a last-place check-in eliminating the team).

A similar game-mechanic was used in the fifth Australian season, the 33rd American season and the fourth leg of the eighth Canadian season to re-introduce the most recently eliminated teams to account for the unexpected withdrawal of racing teams. In the fifth Australian season, this was because one team had mental health reasons. In the 33rd American season, this was because four teams had extenuating circumstances (work, American work visa expiry, pregnancy and a funeral) following a 19-month hiatus caused by the COVID-19 pandemic. Additionally, the two returning teams from that season were given a Speed Bump task as penalty for returning following their elimination (however, this task went unaired in the episode). And in the fourth leg of the eighth Canadian season, this was because three teams tested positive for COVID-19. Additionally like the 33rd American season, there was a Speed Bump task given the two returning teams from that season. This was later used in the sixth leg of the eighth Canadian season to reintroduce the teams that tested positive for COVID-19, but have recovered shortly after. Those teams had to complete an On Ramp task to get back into the race, with the last team being eliminated. The sixth Australian season reintroduced the teams that recovered from COVID-19 as well, and those had to complete a Speed Bump aspect on the leg in which they return.

Partner swap 
The partner swap, only seen in the 30th American season to date, requires teams to swap partners for the remainder of a leg, then reuniting at the Pit Stop.

Double-length legs, no-rest legs and mega legs 
Some seasons have included one or more double-length legs where teams complete two sets of tasks (usually a second Roadblock and second Detour challenge, as well as other Route Info challenges) before arriving at the next Pit Stop, and airs as two episodes on the show. Usually, teams will be led to the show's host with a clue that implies that a Pit Stop is ahead, but are surprised as they are not checked in at a Pit Stop but instead are given a clue to continue racing.

Double-length legs were born out of necessity during season six. The sixth leg in Hungary was initially planned as two legs, with the first leg being a non-elimination leg; however, producers later discovered during the race that begging is illegal in Hungary, which would have made it nearly impossible for the last place team to acquire the money needed to continue in the race (per the non-elimination penalty used at the time, would have stripped them of their travel money and start the following leg with no money). The producers quickly devised the extended leg to mimic the effects of a non-elimination leg (by keeping the same number of teams in the race and allow for the same number of episodes to still be produced), and using a simple video message clue to provide teams the goal for the first task of the second half of the leg.

A variant of this introduced in Season 18 is the no-rest leg (or called the "marathon leg" in the Australian version), also known as the "continue racing" leg, in which teams are checked in at a Pit Stop as normal, after which they are told that the next leg is to begin immediately and are handed their next clue. Typically all teams can continue racing onto the next leg at a no-rest Pit Stop. Usually, in both cases, teams who arrived first at a midpoint or Pit Stop first are not awarded a prize, nor facing elimination or a non-elimination penalty if they came last, except a few cases whereas a team is eliminated during this point of the leg (see Unusual eliminations).

Another variant of this introduced in Season 32 is the mega leg, in which the number of Roadblocks and Detours and the distance are doubled. Unlike the double-length leg and the no-rest leg, there is no Pit Stop in the middle of the leg.

City Sprint 
Introduced in the 32nd American season, teams complete a series of tasks while racing in the city before returning to the starting point, doubling as the leg's Pit Stop. All the tasks involved in the sprint do not contain any Detours or Roadblocks.

Scramble 
Introduced in the 34th American season, the Scramble is an obstacle where teams are informed of the leg's tasks at the start of the leg and can perform them in any order. Completing each task gives a portion of the clue that reveals the location of their ultimate destination.

Pit Stop 
The Pit Stop is the final destination in each leg. Once teams have arrived there and checked in, they are given lodging (which can range from simple accommodations such as tents or cots to complete hotel service) and food free of charge as they wait for the next leg to begin. Teams will also give interviews with the production team to describe their activities from the last leg; this is interspersed during episode footage of that leg on the subsequent broadcast. Teams are generally sequestered to the lodgings but may otherwise use their time freely. In early seasons, teams were allowed to socialize with each other at Pit Stops, but between Season 14 and Season 25, teams were sequestered from each other, and often would not learn of the previous elimination until they saw other teams on the next leg. Following Season 25, teams have occasionally been allowed to mingle with other teams during Pit Stops.

Pit Start 
The Pit Start is the first destination where teams start each leg. Originally, teams would start the leg exactly 12 hours after the moment they reached the previous leg's Pit Stop mat – before accounting for any time credits or penalties accrued in the previous leg. These breaks could be extended by 24-hour increments as needed as to appear 12 hours long during the broadcast. In more recent seasons, time lengths have varied to avoid teams loitering in airports or other areas. Teams are responsible for being ready to leave at the correct time, and no time credit is given should they miss their departure time due to factors such as oversleeping. Due to restrictions of traveling during the COVID-19 pandemic in the 33rd American season's start from the fifth leg, the teams start the subsequent leg by a group (if the race were go to another country, the teams fly together by chartered plane, and start the leg when they arrive at the destination country). Each group consists of two to four teams and are separated by two or three groups (or three or four if the last leg was the non-elimination leg, with one team who was saved from elimination will start singled-out in the final departure group). Each group will start the subsequent leg by 15-minute intervals.

Non-elimination legs 
In each race, a number of legs are predetermined "non-elimination legs", where the last team to check in is not eliminated. Up through the fourth American season, there was no penalty for finishing last on a non-elimination leg. The fourth, fifth, sixth, and eighth Israeli seasons, the French version, the second Philippine season and the sixth Australian season also lacked penalties for non-elimination legs, as did some non-elimination legs on fifth Australian season. While there were plans for the 34th American season to exclude non-elimination legs for the first time in the franchise history, such an idea was in jeopardy due to a positive COVID-19 test from one of the remaining teams. Beginning with the fifth American season, teams who finish in last place in a non-elimination leg are subjected to a penalty in the following leg, usually one of the following:
 Stripped of money (and belongings or vehicles): In Seasons Five through Nine of the American version, the last team to check in was stripped of all money and was not given any money at the start of the next leg, usually forcing that team to literally beg for money from the local population of the city they were in to cover transportation fare. From Seasons Seven through Nine, teams were also forced to give up all their bags and possessions therein, leaving them with only the clothes they happened to be wearing and the fanny packs containing their passports and Race documentation.
 The sixth Vietnamese season had the last team saved from elimination not receiving any money or provided vehicles on the next leg.
 Marked for elimination: In most international versions of the show, as well as in Seasons 10 and 11 of the American version, a team that finished last on a non-elimination leg would be "marked for elimination" on the next leg: should the team fail to win the leg, they would be subject to a 30-minute penalty to be served before being allowed to check in at the Pit Stop. In Legs 4 and 7 of the fourth Vietnamese season, they would be subject to a 45-minute penalty to be served before being allowed to check in at the Pit Stop. In the sixth leg of the second Israeli season, they would be subject to a 1-hour penalty to be served before checking in.

 Speed Bump: From Season 12 and on, a team that finishes last in a non-elimination leg will have to perform a "Speed Bump" penalty task at some point during the next leg; though the tasks are generally not difficult or especially time-consuming, this task must be completed before the team is allowed to rejoin the other teams on the main course. If the team fails to complete or opts to quit the Speed Bump, they will receive a four-hour penalty at the Pit Stop. Though this was absent in the 34th American season, it is still available in the Canadian version.
 On the 27th American season and the fourth Australian season, instead of an additional task, the Speed Bump added another aspect to a task of the following leg, making it harder for the penalized team. This version of the Speed Bump resembled the Handicap penalty used on The Amazing Race Norge.
 The Speed Bump rules changed on the 33rd American season, in which the Speed Bump task was only given to the two returning teams who were originally eliminated, which substituted four teams who had extenuating circumstances and were unable to return after a 19-month break due to the COVID-19 pandemic, which went unaired, but shown on promotional material. The eighth Canadian season also had this type of Speed Bump task in addition to the standard Speed Bump task for the team that came last in a non-elimination leg. The Speed Bump aspect for the returning teams was used on the sixth Australian season.

Other non-elimination penalties 
Other international versions of the Race had different non-elimination penalties that issued to the last-placed teams:

 Handicap (Handikap in Norwegian): Featured in the Norwegian version, teams were handicapped to a specific task by making the task more difficult for the team with the penalty, such as increasing the output requirements for a task (e.g., teams only have to make 50 items at the task, but the team with the Handicap has to make 75) or a penalty may be given, such as requiring both Detours to be done. If the team fails to complete or opts to quit the Handicap, they will receive a four-hour penalty at the Pit Stop. The Speed Bump in the 27th American season and the fourth Australian season resemble the Handicap penalty.
 In the fifth leg of the third Israeli season, the team was required to wear their winter clothing throughout the next leg, which was hot.
 In the seventh leg of the third Israeli season, the team that came last would have to wait an extra 30 minutes before departing on the next leg. This is called a Delayed Start. It was later repeated in the second and sixth Vietnamese seasons, although in the sixth Vietnamese season, the team that came last would have to wait an extra 90 minutes before departing.
 In the first leg of the seventh Israeli season, the team would be on a flight that arrived two hours after the other teams landed in their first destination.
 In the inaugural Vietnamese season, a "Stripped of money and belongings" variant of the "Marked for Elimination" penalty was featured, where the team that came in last on some non-elimination legs was stripped of all their money (and in addition to not acquiring any money at the start of the following leg) should they fail to finish first in the next leg.
 In the second season of the Chinese celebrity edition, two (of the four) non-elimination legs had the penalty on the rest period of the teams instead of a "Speed Bump" (Leg 3 had the last team stay on a shop for a night sleeping on the ground, while Leg 8 was given tickets to fly in economy class instead of business class (which is usually the case in the series)).
 In the Ukrainian version, three non-elimination legs had different penalties. In Legs 2 and 8, the team would receive a 30-minute (Leg 2) or 1-hour (Leg 8) penalty to take regardless of their position. In Leg 11, the team would have to complete an extra task.
 On the fifth Australian season, the leg winner had the privilege of delegating between the bottom two teams a Salvage (to assist the team), and a Sabotage (to penalise the team).
 The Salvage was an advantage given to the receiving team. For example, the team may receive a personal driver for the next leg, the ability to skip queues, or a local guide to accompany them.
 The Sabotage was a penalty given to the receiving team, much like a traditional non-elimination penalty listed above.
 Due to changing the rules of the Speed Bump and restrictions of traveling during COVID-19 pandemic in the 33rd American season, teams who arrived last on a non-elimination leg, would start the next leg singled-out in the final departure group. Following a positive COVID-19 test during the 34th American season, this non-elimination penalty made an unexpected return.

Unusual eliminations 
There have been many eliminations which have been unusual, which may involve a team being eliminated outside a Pit Stop or more than one team being eliminated.
 The first unusual elimination occurred in the 10th American season where the last team to arrive at the midpoint in the first leg (which is an overnight rest area) was eliminated (the leg ended with a standard end-of-leg elimination, accumulating the effects of the first double-elimination leg). A similar twist later occurred in the 25th and 26th American seasons, but both occurred in the final leg, with four teams being reduced to three.
 The 15th American season featured another unusual elimination in its first leg. The race began with 12 teams and the first task offered 11 sets of airline tickets to the first destination city; following the challenge, the last team remaining who did not complete the task did not receive tickets to their first destination and was thus eliminated. The third Chinese and fifth Asian seasons (in both cases, 11 teams began the race and only 10 sets of bus tickets or clues were offered) later repeated the Starting Line elimination; the Asian leg also had a standard end-of-leg elimination, whereas the legs for the first two versions were non-elimination.
 The 19th American season featured a double-elimination leg, where the last two teams to arrive at a Pit Stop were both eliminated. The fourth and fifth Latin American seasons, the second Philippine season, the sixth Vietnamese season, and the eighth Canadian season also featured a double-elimination leg.
 Season two of the Israeli version also featured a double-elimination; one team arriving at the airport last was eliminated (they were not given tickets to travel to the first destination city), in addition to the standard end-of-leg elimination. The airport elimination was also used in the inaugural Norwegian season; however, the first leg was a non-elimination leg.
 The first leg of the 32nd American season, the seventh leg of the fourth Latin American season, the ninth leg of the second Norwegian season and the 17th leg of the sixth Australian season were no-rest legs, but the team who arrived last at the Pit Stop was eliminated. The remaining teams were given their next clue and continued the race. The final leg of the inaugural season of the Chinese celebrity edition repeated the no-rest Pit Stop elimination, but this was a double-length leg.
 Due to the COVID-19 pandemic, the 33rd American season had to halt production indefinitely, in which there were nine teams remaining at the time. When filming resumed 19 months later, four teams were unable to return due to extenuating circumstances and were subsequently eliminated from the race.
 In the sixth leg of the eighth Canadian season the three teams that tested positive for COVID-19 had to complete an On Ramp task, which offered two On Ramp Passes. The last team to find an On Ramp Pass failed to find it and was therefore eliminated.
 Prior to the start of the fifth leg in the 34th American season, one team was removed from the race because one member tested positive for COVID-19.

Gameplay Prizes 
The winners of most legs of the race typically receive a prize (usually from the show's sponsors as a form of Product placement) for the team to enjoy after the race. However, occasionally, the first arriving team will win an advantage to assist them in the race. These gameplay prizes can also be awarded for completing additionally optional tasks.

Express Pass 

The Express Pass, introduced in the 17th American season, allows the team who possesses it to skip one task of the team's choosing. It is usually awarded as a prize to the first-place team in earlier legs, though occasionally, it is awarded through other mechanics, such as being given to the first team to complete a task, by forcing a team to give a pass to another team of their choosing before a certain leg, or even by random. The choice of which task to skip is at the team's discretion, but if the team with the pass is eliminated or the pass is not used by a specific point, the team must give the pass to the host at the Pit Stop. The twist of the Express Pass called Double Express Pass was featured from the 22nd to 24th American seasons, which the team that wins this reward must give the second Express Pass to other teams, with the remainder was kept by the winner as usual. A variation of the Double Express Pass was used in the 27th American season in which the winner of the Express Pass would give the second pass to another team after they had used their pass. The 30th American season was the first season to not feature the Express Pass, though it was still featured in the Canadian version. The eighth Canadian season introduced another twist of the Express Pass called Triple Express Pass, in which the team that wins the prize must give the other two Express Passes to two other teams.

Salvage Pass 
The Salvage Pass, introduced in the second Australian season, is awarded to the winners of the first leg. The team who receives the pass may choose to give themselves a one-hour head start for the start of the next leg of the race or save the last team to arrive at the Pit Stop from elimination. The Salvage Pass was also used alongside the Express Pass in Philippine version; however, teams in the Philippine version have the option of using it to gain a 30-minute advantage at a task. The Express Pass featured in the sixth Vietnamese season gave teams the additional option to use their pass to save the last placing team (or second-last placing team on a double elimination leg) – much like the Salvage Pass.

First Class Pass 
The First Class Pass, introduced in the fifth Australian season, is awarded to the winners of a non-elimination leg. The winners of the pass would be able to skip the next leg and would instead receive a luxury experience while the other teams were racing. Additionally, the First Class Pass holder will allocate "The Salvage" (an advantage to assist the team on the next leg) and "The Sabotage" (a penalty to disadvantage a team) between the Bottom Two teams (see Non-elimination legs).

The Save 
The Save, used in Season 25 and Season 26 (although this was unaired, unclaimed and unused), allows the team holding it to avoid elimination once should they finish last in an elimination leg, up to the ninth leg. The Save can also be given to another team to use if desired. The Save in Season 25 was awarded to the winners of the first leg. In Season 26, it could be obtained during the third leg by completing both sides of the Detour. The Save wasn't used on either season, and has not been featured since Season 27.

Return Ticket 
A twist also called the Save was introduced in the Chinese celebrity edition where the team that won it was required to bring another team back into the competition. In the third season, the Save was renamed to Return Ticket, and the team that won the ticket could bring back another team before the fourth leg. The sixth Israeli season also incorporated the Return Ticket by bringing back previously eliminated teams to compete a leg, with the winner earning the Return Ticket and the ability to return to the competition. In the eighth season of The Amazing Race Canada, this twist was introduced as the On Ramp Pass to bring back two out of three teams eliminated due to COVID-19.

Double Your Money 
The Double Your Money prize was a special prize awarded to the winners of the first leg in Season 21. The team that won the prize on the first leg was eliminated before the final leg and no one was eligible to win  and the prize has not been featured since Season 22.

Final leg 
The final leg of the race is run by the three remaining teams. In earlier American seasons, the leg was a non-elimination or double-length leg, with an intermediate destination in or near the home country (such as Hawaii, Alaska or Canada for the American version) before traveling to the final city back in the home country. However, in later seasons, final legs have been single legs, whereby teams are flown directly from the final foreign country to the final city in the home country. In some races, which was first seen in the Brazilian version, the Finish Line was held outside the home country.

Teams still must complete all the tasks in the final city before they are directed to the Finish Line mat (with a design of the series logo, though some versions used a Pit Stop mat, as seen in the Asian version) to claim the cash reward for the winning team as well as various prizes. At the check-in mat, the host and in most cases the other eliminated teams celebrate the arrival of the teams. Generally, all three teams are allowed to arrive, but in seasons one and four, the third-place team was so far behind and outside the final city that they were given a clue at their next Route Marker that informed them of the results.

A typical feature of the final leg is what is unofficially dubbed the "Final Memory Challenge" – a challenge (either "Route Info" or a "Roadblock"), an often elaborate challenge which tests the contestants on their time spent during the race, with common examples including memory-based tasks based on their observation skills (such as finding items related to the race which they encountered along, usually in sequential order) and knowing how well they understand their partner or the other teams, or any tasks relating to the theme of the journey they have taken (such as completing a puzzle of the world) or the final leg (such as counting poker chips amounting to  representing the grand prize). While the first instance of a memory challenge was in the third American season, it had become a larger trend beginning with the ninth American season – with most subsequent seasons (both American and international versions) including at least one Memory Challenge, which typically appears as the second-to-last or last challenge before reaching the Finish Line. In a few recent seasons, a minor version of a memory challenge may also appear in legs towards the end of the race, usually either in the second or third to last leg.

In the fourth and fifth Israeli seasons, while the Finish Line was still located outside the home country of Israel (which was usual in the series), teams who arrived at the Finish Line (an empty Pit Stop mat and the final clue box) were only told to return to Israel and travel to a specific location before being informed the outcome. The French version was identical to the fourth and fifth Israeli seasons, except that Finish Line was held inside the home country of France. From the sixth Israeli season onwards, teams briefly return to Israel and complete one more set of tasks before arriving at the Finish Line in the home country.

In the 25th and 26th American seasons, four teams raced the final leg, but at some point during the leg one of the four teams was eliminated from the race. This twist was also included on the sixth Vietnamese season and the eighth Canadian season without the mid-leg elimination, effectively making the latter two the first two times in the franchise's history four teams crossed the Finish Line.

In the 29th and 33rd American seasons, the final leg didn't feature either a Roadblock or a Detour.

Rules and penalties 
All teams must abide by the rules set at the beginning of the race, and teams are given time penalties for any rule infraction, which can negatively affect finishing position in that leg of the race. Usually in a non-elimination leg, if the last team to arrive at the mat is checked in before a previous team has completed its penalty, any remainder of the penalty time will be applied at the start of the next leg of the race, beginning at the departure time of the next-to-last team; in some cases, if multiple teams are penalized and were the last set of teams to arrive, the teams who did not finish last (as long as their penalties does not affect the placements) are allowed to check-in immediately with the penalty to be applied at the start of the next leg. In a no-rest leg, the last team will be given their next clue immediately while any remainder of the penalty will be removed.

While the complete set of official rules has not been released to the public, certain rules have been revealed during the various versions of the race:

Rules 
 Unless otherwise stated, such as during Roadblocks, team members must stay within  of each other and stay close to their assigned camera and sound crew. When using any form of transportation, unless otherwise stated, teams must be able to travel with the camera crew. Teams are recorded requesting only two tickets after they have made their initial request for four.
 Teams are required to purchase economy class airfare when they fly, using the credit card provided by the show. The airline, at its discretion, however, may upgrade the team(s) so long as there are no additional costs. Teams may use their cash stipend to purchase first-class fares for other modes of transportation. Teams may be forbidden from flying on certain airlines or restricted to specific airlines or restricted to transit in certain countries varying on seasons.
 Teams are prohibited from contacting friends, family, and acquaintances during the Race without supervision. The Race however may provide them with an opportunity to contact them at select times. When this happens while the Race is going on, teams are not allowed to proceed to their next task. In special circumstances, the production team will allow racers to contact family members outside a race-required task.
 Unless otherwise stated by the clues, teams are allowed to use the help of locals for navigating and during tasks. Teams are required to have any locals who appear on camera sign release forms that legally clear the footage for use; some teams have avoided or reduced contacts with random local strangers because the release process can take a very long time to complete.
 Teams are free to work together at any point unless otherwise stated by the rules. Excluding the use of the Yield and U-Turn, teams are prohibited from hindering the performance of other teams such as by taking extra clues from a clue box, taking another team's assigned vehicle, altering the equipment for other teams at a task or using more than one Yield or one U-Turn at a time.
 In any tasks that provide the teams with equipment, tools, animals, guides, or other props, teams are forbidden from changing these mid-task. Teams are forbidden from interfering with such equipment for other teams. When teams are given rental cars, and the car breaks down outside the team's control, they will be given a replacement vehicle but given no additional time credits for the time it takes to make the changeover.
 Teams are prohibited from possessing maps, guidebooks, cell phones, personal digital assistants and other similar aids at the start of the Race, but may use the provided money to purchase these as they progress. These may be provided by the show if required for a certain task.
 Teams are prohibited from using their personal items to barter for services on the Race, though they are not necessarily prohibited from selling them for cash. The teams' bags may be subject to review during Pit Stops by production. Teams are free to sell or barter any items they have purchased during the Race.
 In cases where teams are instructed to walk or drive themselves to a destination, teams are not allowed to hire a taxi to guide or take them through the route. In early seasons of the original series, teams frequently employed this tactic; several exchanges of dialogue in the 17th American season indicate that it is now prohibited.
 Teams are expected to keep the Race fanny pack containing their cash, passports, clues, and other documents with them at all times. Other items mandated by clues are subject to this requirement. Teams that do not have these upon check-in at a Pit Stop are required to go back and retrieve the pack and any missing mandatory contents (e.g., passports) before being checked in. In one case, during 21st American season, a team had one of their passports stolen by a cab driver during a non-elimination leg that was followed by a leg in the same country. The team was checked-in last for a non-elimination finish and allowed to race in the following leg but would be eliminated if they still lacked their passport by the time they were required to produce one for international travel. Teams may check in after losing or abandoning any non-mandatory items (e.g., items of clothing), but they must continue the Race without them.
 Teams must complete each challenge as specified by the clues given to them throughout the Race. Should a team fail to properly complete a challenge, violate any provisions made in a clue or task description, or miss a clue altogether (unless specifically allowed to do so, e.g., by winning the Fast Forward, or by using an Express Pass), they must either go back to the location of the challenge and complete the challenge, or incur a penalty when they check in (see Penalties and time credits).
 To check in, all team members must step on the mat. As seen in the 30th American season and later on the eighth Israeli season, legs may end in a photo finish (and in both cases, the close finish was between the last two teams); the last team to step onto the mat was declared last-place team. This rule was also alluded to orally by teams on the fourth Australian season.
 Teams are forbidden from touching another team's belongings, such as removing them from a taxi to use the new taxi. However, if the taxi driver removes the items, the team will not be penalized. Teams also may not intentionally hinder another team by hiding materials needed for a task.
 Teams are prohibited from begging where it is illegal. On the American version, teams are additionally prohibited from begging at U.S. airports.
 Team members may not smoke during the Race.
 Teams are required to abide by all local laws of the country where they are racing.
 Starting in the 25th American season, teams may only book one travel itinerary for themselves. They were no longer able to book a second set of tickets if they subsequently discovered a second flight that they preferred once they purchased the first booking. DVD commentary for the first season reveals that this was originally a rule, but was dropped for the second season.

The teams are often given additional rules and instructions that apply specifically to a given leg or to a task supplied with one of the clues; these are usually not explained to the viewer unless they affect the Race results.

Penalties and time credits 
If a team trying to check in at the Pit Stop has committed an infraction during the leg, the team generally must return to the point of infraction and perform the task or action correctly before being allowed to check in. If it is impossible to correct the action, the team is instead asked to wait at a nearby spot to serve a penalty period before being allowed to officially check-in. The penalty for most rule infractions is 30 minutes, plus any time gained from breaking the rule. Minor violations for various tasks would have a penalty of 15 minutes, while some violations have longer penalties: two hours for bartering personal goods for services, up to four hours for failing to complete a miscellaneous task, four hours for failing to complete a Roadblock or Speed Bump, six hours for failing to complete a Detour (or completing a Fast Forward incorrectly), or 24 hours for flying outside of economy class, if doing so cost more than the economy class fare. Earlier seasons of the Race enforced a 24-hour penalty for not completing either Detour option, but by season 17, the penalty was reduced to six hours. If teams incur multiple penalties, they are cumulative.

A penalized team does not generally have to wait out its full penalty time at the Pit Stop if the team is in last place and all other teams have already checked in; unless if the leg was a non-elimination or a no-rest, the team will be eliminated immediately; otherwise, either the remainder of the penalty will be applied to the team's start time on the next leg, or in the event of a no-rest leg, any penalty would be nullified. Occasionally, infractions have come to the production team's attention only after the team has checked in; in these cases, the penalty will be applied to the start of the next leg (with viewers given notification if it affects the departure order). In the 3rd American season, such a situation resulted in changing which team finished in last place; production brought the penalized team back to the Pit Stop, where the host explained to the teammates what had happened before their elimination.

Should a vehicle (including cars and boats) break down through no fault of the team using it, a replacement vehicle is provided for them, but "no time credit is given for their wait in this unlucky situation."

Teams may also receive time credits, applied to the next leg, that results from "production difficulties." These are only revealed to the viewer if they affect the placement at the start of the next leg.

Roadblock penalties 
In most versions, there is a four-hour penalty for not completing a Roadblock, which is served upon arrival at the Pit Stop. On the American version, the penalty can be enforced in a number of ways:
 If circumstances force the penalized team to continue racing (e.g., the site is about to close for the day), the penalty is served at the Pit Stop.
 If they are not forced to continue racing, and all teams have arrived at the Roadblock, the penalty begins the moment the team announces their intention to quit.
 If they are not forced to continue racing, and at least one team has yet to arrive at the Roadblock, the penalty does not begin until the next team arrives. In two cases, the second Israeli season has only a one-hour penalty for not finishing a Roadblock task, while in the 20th American season, one Roadblock had a task which only had a limited number of props for teams to use in attempting the task; if they ran out, they only had to serve a two-hour penalty before checking in at the Pit Stop.
 If a racer provides illegal assistance to their partner completing a Roadblock, the penalty (usually 30 minutes) is issued at the Pit Stop.

Production 
The production of The Amazing Race is a challenge due to its premise being a race around the world. Among the difficult duties that producers face, scouting out locations, designing tasks, selecting teams, and planning logistics for the entire course are the most important to accomplish in pre-production. During the Race, the camera crews need to keep up with the movement of the teams and the host. And when the footage for the entire season has been recorded and edited, team members, production crew as well as the local staff who hosted or facilitated the tasks are obliged to keep the details of the race confidential and not leak out anything that hints at locations, events, or outcomes of the Race. An exception is the television network that airs the show in a country which hosted one of the legs where they can air teasers such as "Who among the teams will come here to (the network's home country name)?" However, in recent American seasons, CBS had released a map to show the locations that the racers would be visiting.

The show is broadcast on CBS in the United States and simulcast via satellite in various networks around the world.

Through its efforts, the American version has received many accolades, including Primetime Emmy Awards and nominations in categories for audio and video production and editing. In 2010, CBS announced that season 18 of the show would be broadcast in high definition.

International versions 

The original version of The Amazing Race is the American version, which debuted on CBS on September 5, 2001, with Phil Keoghan as the host. In October 2005, CBS optioned The Amazing Race for franchising to other countries.

Asia and Oceania 
The Amazing Race Asia was the first Asian version of the show. The regional version was bought by Buena Vista International Television – Asia Pacific (BVITV–AP) and Sony Pictures Television International in October 2005. Auditions were then announced that took place in February to March 2006. The show first aired on November 9, 2006, on AXN Asia and was hosted by Allan Wu. The show aired for three more seasons, with the last season having ended in 2010. After a six-year hiatus, the series was announced to be returning for a 5th season to air in late 2016.

On April 8, 2008, Israeli television network Reshet announced their own their version of the show, HaMerotz LaMillion ('The Race to the Million'). Its first season premiered on February 5, 2009, on Channel 2. The first four seasons of the show was a co-production by Reshet and activeTV, an Australian production company that had also produced the Asian version of the race. Since the fifth season, the show has been produced in-house by Reshet, and in 2017 Reshet launched their own channel that became the new home of the show starting with the sixth season. After the eighth season, the show went on hiatus for 2 years until October 2022, when it was announced that the ninth season would be produced by Keshet Media Group and broadcast on Channel 12.

In March 2010, a Chinese version of the show, The Amazing Race: China Rush, was announced by the Disney–ABC International Television Asia Pacific. The show was produced by Shanghai-based international production company Fly Films; the company had previously produced Shanghai Rush in 2009, a show heavily influenced by The Amazing Race. The first season was filmed between March and April 2010 and aired in August 2010 by International Channel of Shanghai and was hosted by Allan Wu, who had also previously hosted the Asian version. The Chinese version ran for three seasons, with the last season having ended in 2012. In 2014, Shenzhen Media Group announced they had bought the rights to The Amazing Race and would be producing a new Chinese version of the program, unrelated to Shanghai Media Group's China Rush.

On July 19, 2010, Australian channel Seven Network purchased the format rights to produce the Australian series. The Amazing Race Australia was produced by activeTV in association with ABC Studios and was distributed by Disney Media Distribution Asia Pacific. The host for the first 3 series was New Zealand-born actor Grant Bowler. Two series were produced in 2011 and 2012 and after a brief hiatus in 2013, a third season was produced in-house and without activeTV in 2014. This series also included teams from both Australia and New Zealand. Following another hiatus for 5 years, the show was revived by Network 10 in 2019. This new series was produced by Eureka Productions and hosted by former rugby league footballer Beau Ryan. The first season of 10's iteration – and the fourth season overall – premiered on October 28, 2019.

On March 26, 2011, it was announced that TV5 had acquired the rights to produce a Philippine version of The Amazing Race. The first season of The Amazing Race Philippines aired on October 29, 2012, and ended on December 15, 2012. Derek Ramsay hosted the show. The show aired a second season in 2014.

Vietnam bought the format as The Amazing Race Vietnam – Cuộc đua kỳ thú. It was announced on March 1, 2012, by BHD Corp. and VTV3. Dustin Nguyen served as the director, executive producer and host of the first season of the show. The second, third, and fifth seasons were broadcast with Huy Khánh as the host, with Phan Anh filling in during the fourth season. After a three-year hiatus, the show was revived with Song Luân as host.

Europe 
During 2005, AXN Central Europe announced a version of the show to be called The Amazing Race Central Europe. Applications were closed with the submission of 2,500 applicants, with filming expected to have occurred in 2006 and broadcast from September 2006. The show was cast but was never filmed.

By October 2011, a Norwegian version of the show titled The Amazing Race Norge was announced by TV 2. Applications were open from October 11, 2011, to October 31, 2011. Filming took place in January 2012. Ex-football player Freddy dos Santos hosted the show. The first season premiered on April 11, 2012. The second and latest season ended on May 29, 2013.

On March 23, 2012, a French version of the show was announced. It was produced by Shine France for D8 with filming having occurred between June and July 2012. It premiered on October 22 of the same year. The finale aired on December 24.

On July 23, 2012, a Ukrainian version of the show was announced, called Velyki Perehony. It premiered on April 13, 2013, at 20:00, and concluded on June 29, 2013.

America 
In late 2006, a South-American independent production company announced that it would produce a Brazilian version in 2007, to be called The Amazing Race: A Corrida Milionária, and to be aired in a purchased time slot in the Brazilian network RedeTV!. Applications were open from January until July, and filming occurred during August and September. The first and only season premiered on October 13, 2007, and concluded on January 5, 2008.

On October 15, 2008, a Latin American version of the show was announced by Discovery Latin America in association with Disney and Harris Whitbeck presented the show. The first season was filmed in early 2009 and broadcast late in that year across Latin America and the Caribbean and the second season aired in late 2010. In January 2011 it was announced that Space acquired the rights to produce the third season of the show. The fourth season also aired on Space in September 2012, but solely composed of Brazilian teams with Paulo Zulu as the host, replacing Whitbeck. In the fifth season, María Victoria "Toya" Montoya, a former contestant from the third season, replaced Whitbeck as regular host of the series.

On November 30, 2012, it was revealed that CTV would produce a Canadian version of The Amazing Race. An announcement made by Phil Keoghan aired on this channel during the December 2, 2012, episode of the American version of the show. The show premiered on July 15, 2013, with Olympic gold medalist Jon Montgomery as host and has since aired eight seasons.

International versions 
The most recent winners are dating couple Derek Xiao & Claire Rehfuss who won The Amazing Race 34.

 Currently airing (0)
 An upcoming season (3)
 No longer airing (10)
 Status unknown (1)

Other media

Video games 
A video game based on this reality show was developed by Ludia and published by Ubisoft for the Wii. It was released on November 2, 2010, in North America.

The game features many countries previously visited on real races, as well as some new ones like Venezuela. Host Phil Keoghan provided voice-acting throughout the entire game.

Players customize their own characters and can race against other, pre-made characters. These existing teams are showcased in the opening, which closely mirrors the actual show's opening (including the use of the same music). However, when playing the actual game, no-one, not even the player, is referred to by name. Instead, teams are differentiated by color (ex. team yellow).

The rules of the race are fairly similar to the actual race. Teams receive money, fly to a location and complete various tasks (which were represented by a large collection of minigames). The last team to arrive is eliminated, unless they are saved by a non-elimination leg, in which the penalty is the team loses all their money they saved up to that point (unlike the show during seasons 5–9, the teams are still given money at the start of the next leg). However, all teams leave the Pit Stop at the same time.

Some clues had changes to their rules: while the Detour and Roadblock retain their rules, there is no limit on individual Roadblocks. Fast Forwards appear in the race, but they are not optional, and the team that completes it the fastest gets a two-hour time credit. The Intersection marker was also present, however, the rules were changed to a task that all teams complete, similar to an additional task on the real race. The Yield, U-Turn, Speed Bump, and Express Pass are not featured in this game.

As an added bonus, completing various tasks and doing certain objectives in the game will unlock "video files." These are selected clips from the actual U.S. TV show; usually featuring notable clips selected from the first 15 seasons, such as extremely dramatic moments (examples are Uchenna & Joyce couldn't pay their taxi driver at the final Pit Stop and Chris & Alex making the closest finish in The Amazing Race 2) or funny moments (such as when Fran & Barry kept walking past a clue that was within arm's length). The clips appear exactly as they did on TV, except that all logos are pixelated, even those that went uncensored on TV. 

Ludia and Ubisoft also made a version of the game for the iPhone, iPod Touch and iPad.

Parodies 
In 2015, a Canadian animated Amazing Race parody program titled The Ridonculous Race aired on Teletoon and Cartoon Network. The show itself is a spin-off the Total Drama series (which is, in turn, a parody of other reality shows, predominately Survivor). The animated show features 18 teams of two who will compete in a race around the world for C$1,000,000. The show is hosted by Don, who is modelled after The Amazing Race US host, Phil Keoghan. The teams race to "Don Boxes" to receive their next "travel tip", which will instruct the teams to complete challenges and go to other locations. Like The Amazing Race, there are a variety of challenge types. There are "either or"; in which the teams are given a choice of two choices (like a Detour), a "botch or watch"; which only one member of the team can complete the task (like a Roadblock), and "all-ins"; in which both members must complete the given task. At the end of each episode, there is a "Chill Zone" which the teams may rest until the next episode. Teams check into the "chill zones" by stepping on the "carpet of completion". The last team to set foot on the carpet may be eliminated from the race. The first team to reach the final "chill zone" will win C$1,000,000.

In the adult sitcom show American Dad, there is an episode called "The Bitchin Race", where the show's characters compete in a reality show that's similar to The Amazing Race. The episode also featured Phil Keoghan portraying the host of the show himself.

See also 
City Chase
Expedition Impossible
The Global Scavenger Hunt
Lost (reality TV series)
Peking Express
Shanghai Rush
Race Around the World (Australia)
Race Across the World (UK)
Race the World (China)
Race to the Center of the Earth

Notes

References

External links 
 
 
 

 
Disney Media Networks franchises
Television franchises
Reality television series franchises